The Cyclone is a 1920 American silent action-adventure film directed by Clifford Smith and starring Tom Mix, Colleen Moore, Henry Herbert, William Ellingford, and Buck Jones. The film was released by Fox Film Corporation on January 25, 1920.

Cast
Tom Mix as Sergeant Tim Ryerson
Colleen Moore as Sylvia Sturgis
Henry Herbert as Ferdinand Baird
William Ellingford as Silas Sturgis
Buck Jones as Minor Role

Preservation
With no listings in any film archives, The Cyclone is considered to be a lost film.

References

External links

American silent films
Silent action adventure films
American action adventure films
American silent feature films
Fox Film films
1920 films
Lost American films
1920 lost films
Films directed by Clifford Smith
1920s American films
1920s English-language films

American black-and-white films
Silent thriller films